Anthony Neary (born 25 November 1948) is a former England international rugby union player. He represented England at U18s basketball as well as rugby. He attended De La Salle College in Pendleton, Salford and Liverpool University before qualifying as a solicitor.

Rugby career
Neary played club rugby for Broughton Park. An open-side wing-forward whose international career ran from 1971 to 1980, his 43 appearances for the England team were a record (subsequently beaten) at the time of his retirement. He captained England in seven international matches between March 1975 and March 1976, played for the Barbarians, and toured twice with the British and Irish Lions - to South Africa in 1974 and New Zealand in 1977, playing one international. He was a member of the famous North team which beat the All Blacks at Otley on 17 November 1979. He was one of four Broughton Park players in this side and was joined by teammates Kevin O’Brien at full back, Tony Bond in the centre and Jim Sydall in the second row.  Along with Broughton Park team mate Mike Leadbetter, he was also part of a famous North West Counties team which defeated the All Blacks, 16-14, in Workington in 1972.

Conviction
Neary was jailed for 5 years for theft in February 1998 after admitting stealing money from a trust fund of millionaire friend John Gorna. After his release, he commented on living in London since his release - recently said: "I don't follow rugby any more, I'm just looking to get on with my life."

References

1948 births
Living people
North of England Rugby Union team
English rugby union players
British & Irish Lions rugby union players from England
England international rugby union players
Rugby union flankers
Barbarian F.C. players
Lancashire County RFU players
Alumni of the University of Liverpool
Rugby union players from Manchester